Daniel Cabral de Oliveira (born 14 May 2002) is a Brazilian footballer who plays as a midfielder for Flamengo.

Career statistics

Club

Honours

Club
Flamengo
Campeonato Carioca: 2021
Copa do Brasil: 2022

International
Brazil U17
FIFA U-17 World Cup: 2019

References

2002 births
Living people
Brazilian footballers
Brazilian men's futsal players
Brazil youth international footballers
Association football midfielders
CR Flamengo footballers
Sportspeople from Rio de Janeiro (state)